Pius Lee is an American political power broker and landlord. He was a long-time supporter of Mayor Willie Brown and has served as the commissioner on several governmental commissions in San Francisco, including the San Francisco Port Commission and the San Francisco Police Commission. He serves as the chairman of the Chinese Six Companies and the Chinese Neighborhood Association.

Biography 
Lee's family were landlords. As a teenager, Lee fled to Macau from the newly founded Communist republic in China with his father. From there, they moved to Hong Kong, where they stayed until 1963, when they moved to San Francisco in 1963 under a refugee support program.

After moving to San Francisco, he worked odd jobs while attending night school and later became a licensed real estate agent. He sold homes to Chinese families in the Richmond District and Sunset District and built a real estate portfolio consisting of properties across San Francisco, from the Marina District to Chinatown. Lee is the owner of California Land and Realty, Inc.

Political career 
Lee was appointed president of the San Francisco-Taipei Sister City Committee by Mayor Dianne Feinstein. As president, he began the effort to build the Golden Gate Pavilion in Golden Gate Park in 1981.

Lee ran for San Francisco Board of Supervisors in the 1980s and got 25,000 votes. Mayor Willie Brown appointed Lee to the San Francisco Port Commission. He's also served on Chinatown Economic Development Group, the Industrial Welfare Commission and the Police Commission among others. In 1992, Lee organized a gun buyback program while serving as a police commissioner that gathered approximately 1,600 guns.

Lee resigned from the San Francisco Port Commission in 2002 over remarks by Mayor Willie Brown in regards to Lee's relationship with Planning Commissioner Hector Chinchilla. Brown said, "Pius paid [Chinchilla] what some might look at as a $20,000 bribe". Chinchilla was arrested in November 2002 for misdemeanor charges of allegedly hiring himself out to three developers seeking planning commission permits, one of whom was Lee. Lee believed Brown's remark would have influenced the Board of Supervisor's decision to not approve Lee's project of converting the Apollo Theater on Geneva Avenue in the Outer Mission into a Walgreens.

Political influence 
Lee praised the Democratic Party for their policies toward minorities and the impoverished but also admitted that it is impractical to be a Republican in San Francisco. 

Lee has an extensive guanxi, or social network. President Lee Teng-hui of Taiwan, a friend of Lee's and then mayor of Taipei, contributed toward the Golden Gate Pavilion project in Golden Gate Park. Lee organized a fundraiser for Willie Brown's 1999 San Francisco mayoral campaign. He endorsed London Breed in the 2018 San Francisco mayoral special election, saying “[Breed] said publicly that she will carry on Ed Lee’s policies and programs in Chinatown".

Lee is the chairman of the Chinese Six Companies, which holds significant political influence in San Francisco Chinatown, and the Chinese Neighborhood Association. The two organizations lobbied the San Francisco Municipal Transportation Agency to ban marijuana ads on MUNI buses and proposed a 50-dispensary cap in San Francisco. Lee endorsed Supervisor Aaron Peskin's call to ban dispensaries in Chinatown.

According to Claire Jean Kim, Lee and Chinatown power broker Rose Pak were "famously at odds." Lee and Pak both opposed a proposed recall of Mayor Ed Lee in 2016.

References 

Year of birth missing (living people)
Politics of San Francisco
People from Chinatown, San Francisco
American landlords
American real estate brokers
Living people